The Network of Schools of Public Policy, Affairs, and Administration (NASPAA) is a Washington, D.C.-based non-profit organization. It is an international association and accreditation body of public affairs schools also known as schools of public policy and administration at universities in the United States and abroad. NASPAA is also the sole body in the United States recognized by the Council for Higher Education Accreditation (CHEA) as the accreditor of master's degree programs in public policy (MPP), public affairs (MPAff), and public administration (MPA). Its stated mission is to "ensure excellence in education and training for public service and to promote the ideal of public service." It administers the honor society Pi Alpha Alpha.

History and mission
Founded in 1970, NASPAA serves as a national and international resource for the promotion of excellence in education for the public service. Its institutional membership includes more than 280 university programs in the United States in public administration, policy, and management. NASPAA is also the accreditator of its member schools, seeking to promote the quality of education. It accomplishes its purposes through direct services to its member institutions and by: 
Developing and administering appropriate standards for educational programs in public affairs through its Executive Council and its Commission on Peer Review and Accreditation; 
Representing to governments and other institutions the objectives and needs of education for public affairs and administration; 
Encouraging curriculum development and innovation and providing a forum for publication and discussion of education scholarship, practices, and issues; 
Undertaking surveys that provide members and the public with information on key educational issues; 
Meeting with employers to promote internship and employment for students and graduates; 
Undertaking joint educational projects with practitioner professional organizations; and 
Collaborating with institutes and schools of public administration in other countries through conferences, consortia, and joint projects.

NASPAA provides opportunities for international engagement for NASPAA members, placing a global emphasis on educational quality and quality assurance through a series of networked international initiatives, in particular the Network of Institutes and Schools of Public Administration in Central and Eastern Europe (NISPAcee), the Inter-American Network of Public Administration Education (INPAE), and the Georgian Institute of Public Affairs (GIPA). It is also involved locally, directing the Small Communities Outreach Project for Environmental Issues, which networks public affairs schools and local governments around environmental regulation policy issues, with support from the Environmental Protection Agency.

In 2013, NASPAA changed its name from the National Association of Schools of Public Affairs and Administration to the Network of Schools of Public Policy, Affairs, and Administration to reflect its "growing international membership and disciplinary breadth."

Journal of Public Affairs Education

The Journal of Public Affairs Education (JPAE) is a quarterly, peer-reviewed, academic journal of public administration education that is published by Taylor & Francis on behalf of the Network of Schools of Public Policy, Affairs, and Administration. The journal was established in 1995, and has been edited by Bruce D. McDonald, III (North Carolina State University) and William Hatcher (Augusta University) since 2017.

The Journal of Public Administration Education was founded in 1995 by H. George Frederickson. Initially published in coordination with the American Society for Public Administration's Section on Public Administration Education (SPAE), the National Association of Schools of Public Affairs and Administration (NASPAA) began discussions in 1996 of sponsoring the journal. In the fall of 1997, Frederickson transferred ownership of the journal to NASPAA. Under the new ownership, NASPAA elected to change the name of the journal to the Journal of Public Affairs Education to reflect the breadth of the NASPAA's mission and to increase the appeal of the journal. Despite the change in name ownership, the journal has continued to maintain a loose affiliation with SPAE.

After taking ownership of the journal, JPAE was self-published by NASPAA; however, in 2017 a publishing agreement was reached between NASPAA and Taylor & Francis. Since January 2018, Taylor & Francis has overseen the production and distribution of the journal.

Presidents
2019-2020 - Robert C. Orr, University of Maryland, College Park
2018-2019 - Palmira N. Rios-Gonzalez, University of Puerto Rico
2017-2018 - Jack W. Meek, University of La Verne
2016-2017 - David Birdell, Baruch College
2015-2016 - Michelle Piskulich, Oakland University
2014-2015 - J. Edward Kellough, University of Georgia
2013-2014 - Ethel Hill Williams, University of Nebraska Omaha
2012-2013 - Jack Knott, University of Southern California
2011-2012 - Nadia Rubaii, Binghamton University
2010-2011 - Frances Berry, Florida State University
2009-2010 - Jeffrey Raffel, University of Delaware
2008-2009 - Marvin Mandell, University of Maryland, Baltimore County
2007-2008 - Kathleen Beatty, University of Colorado Denver
2006-2007 - Kathryn Newcomer, George Washington University
2005-2006 - Dan Mazmanian, University of Southern California
2004-2005 - Eugenia Toma, University of Kentucky
2003-2004 - B.J. Reed, University of Nebraska at Omaha
2002-2003 - Jo Ivey Boufford, New York University
2001-2002 - Carolyn Ban, University of Pittsburgh
2000-2001 - Thomas P. Lauth, University of Georgia
1999-2000 - Walter D. Broadnax, American University
1998-1999 - Cornelius M. Kerwin, American University
1997-1998 - Margaret Gordon, University of Washington
1996-1997 - Charles Wise, Indiana University (Bloomington)
1995-1996 - Patricia W. Ingraham, Syracuse University
1994-1995 - Davis B. Bobrow, University of Pittsburgh
1993-1994 - H. Brinton Milward, University of Arizona
1992-1993 - Naomi B. Lynn, Sangamon State University
1991-1992 - Frank J. Thompson, University at Albany, SUNY
1990-1991 - Adam W. Herbert, University of North Florida
1989-1990 - Eleanor V. Laudicina, Kean College of New Jersey
1988-1989 - Max R. Sherman, University of Texas at Austin
1987-1988 - Delmer D. Dunn, University of Georgia
1986-1987 - Richard D. Heimovics, University of Missouri–Kansas City
1985-1986 - Astrid E. Merget, Ohio State University
1984-1985 - Robert E. Cleary, American University
1983-1984 - Augustus Turnbull, III, Florida State University
1982-1983 - Robert P. Biller, University of Southern California
1981-1982 - Donald Stokes, Princeton University
1980-1981 - Norman J. Johnson, Carnegie Mellon University 
1979-1980 - Clinton V. Oster, Ohio State University
1978-1979 - James D. Kitchen, San Diego State University
1977-1978 - C. Dwight Waldo, Syracuse University
1976-1977 - Charles F. Bonser, Indiana University
1975-1976 - Alan K. Campbell, Syracuse University
1974-1975 - Thomas P. Murphy, University of Maryland
1973-1974 - Clyde J. Wingfield, Baruch College, City University of New York
1972-1973 - Morris W.H. Collins, University of Georgia
1971-1972 - Laurin L. Henry, University of Virginia
1970-1971 - Robert F. Wilcox, San Diego State University

References

External links
Official website
Journal of Public Affairs Education
PublicServiceCareers.org

School accreditors
Non-profit organizations based in Washington, D.C.
Public policy schools
Public administration schools